Marmon may refer to:

People
 Jacky Marmon (c. 1798–1880), Australian sailor
 Daniel W. Marmon (1844–1909), American industrialist
 Susie Rayos Marmon (1877–1988), Native American educator, historian, and storyteller
 Lee Marmon (1925–2021), Native American photographer and author
 Neale Marmon (born 1961), former English footballer

Companies
 Nordyke Marmon & Company, a US manufacturer of flour mills until the 1920s
 Marmon Motor Car Company, a US manufacturer of automobiles until 1933
 Marmon-Herrington, the successor company to the Marmon Motor Car Company
 Marmon Group, a Chicago, Illinois industrial company
 Marmon Motor Company, a defunct Texas-based manufacturer of premium trucks